M1904 may refer to:

 6-inch siege gun M1904, Imperial Russian artillery gun
 76-mm mountain gun M1904, see List of mountain artillery
 M1904 model of the Maxim gun
 M1904 or Winchester Model 1904 rifle, see List of Winchester models
 M1904 carbine, variant of the Krag–Jørgensen bolt-action rifle
 M1904 saddle, variant of the McClellan saddle
 F119 Telescope Panoramic variant M1904, see List of the United States Army fire control and sighting material by supply catalog designation
 F135 Mount Telescope variants M1904A1 and M1904A1M1, see List of the United States Army fire control and sighting material by supply catalog designation